HD 64307, also known as HR 3075,  is a solitary, orange hued star located in the northern circumpolar constellation Camelopardalis. It has an apparent magnitude of 5.35, allowing it to be faintly seen with the naked eye. Based on parallax measurements from the Gaia spacecraft, The object is estimated to be 690 light years distant.

HD 64307 is an evolved star with a stellar classification of K3 III. Gaia DR3 stellar evolution models place it on the red giant branch.

References

Camelopardalis (constellation)
K-type giants
064307
3075
039117
BD+74 338